AS Vénus is a football club from Mahina, on the Tahiti island of French Polynesia. They play in the Tahiti First Division. They play home games at Stade Municipal de Mahina. The club have a partnership with metropolitan giants AS Saint-Étienne.

Honours
Tahiti First Division
Champions (10): 1953, 1990, 1992, 1995, 1997, 1998, 1999, 2000, 2002, 2018–19

Tahiti Cup
Winners (9): 1952, 1990, 1991, 1992, 1998, 1999, 2019, 2021, 2022.
 
Tahiti Coupe des ChampionsWinners (2): 1995, 1999.Coupe T.O.M.Winners (5): 1997, 1998, 1999, 2000, 2002Outremer Champions CupWinners:' 1999

Recent seasons

Continental record

Current squadAs of 4 August 2022. Squad for the 2022 OFC Champions League''

Historic goalscorer

References

External links
Official website

Football clubs in Tahiti
Football clubs in French Polynesia
Association football clubs established in 1945
1945 establishments in French Polynesia